Iceland participated in the 2010 Summer Youth Olympics in Singapore.

The Iceland team consisted of 6 athletes competing in 1 sport: aquatics (swimming).

Swimming

Boys

Girls

Mixed

References

External links
Competitors List: Iceland

Nations at the 2010 Summer Youth Olympics
2010 in Icelandic sport
Iceland at the Youth Olympics